Bruce Valentine Hain (September 3, 1915 – August 11, 1995) was American politician who served as a member of the  Alabama House of Representatives from 1954 to 1970, representing Dallas County, Alabama. He lived in Selma, Alabama and was an attorney.

References

1915 births
1995 deaths